Saleboda  is a village in Karlskrona Municipality, Blekinge County, southeastern Sweden. According to the 2005 census it had a population of 120 people.

Populated places in Karlskrona Municipality